Muhammet Özkal (born 26 November 1999) is a Turkish professional footballer who plays as a defender for Süper Lig club Denizlispor.

Club career
On 3 January 2020, Özkal signed a 4.5-year deal with Denizlispor. He made his Süper Lig debut in a 2-1 defeat over Galatasaray on 19 January 2020 and scored a goal in this game.

References

External links
TFF Profile
Mackolik Profile

1999 births
Living people
People from İzmit
Turkish footballers
Denizlispor footballers
Association football defenders
TFF Second League players
Süper Lig players